Grodziński (masculine), Grodzińska (feminine) is a Polish surname. Notable people with the surname include:

 Avraham Grodzinski, Lithuanian rabbi, Slabodka yeshiva's spiritual supervisor 
 Chaim Ozer Grodzinski (1863-1940), Lithuanian rabbi
 Eugeniusz Grodziński (1912-1994), Polish philosopher
 John R. Grodzinski, 21st century author/reviewer, military topics include War of 1812, Canadian Army
 (1899 - 1920 ), Polish military nurse
 Zvi Hirsch Grodzinski (1850s-1947), Belarus-born American Orthodox rabbi

See also

 Grodzinski Bakery, a chain of kosher bakeries in London and Toronto

Polish-language surnames